The 7th Platino Awards honoured the best in Ibero-American films of 2019 presented by the Entidad de Gestión de Derechos de los Productores Audiovisuales (EGEDA) and the Federación Iberoamericana de Productores Cinematográficos y Audiovisuales (FIPCA).
The ceremony was meant to take place at Gran Tlachco Theater in Riviera Maya, Mexico on May 3, 2020 but due to the COVID-19 pandemic was postponed. The nominees were announced on March 18, 2020  and the winners were presented by Majida Issa, Omar Chaparro y Juan Carlos Arciniegas via YouTube on June 29, 2020.

Winners and nominees

Film

Television

References

External links
 Official site

7
Platino